Nikolayevka is a rural locality (a selo) and the administrative center of Nikolayevsky Selsoviet, Narimanovsky District, Astrakhan Oblast, Russia. The population was 1,598 as of 2010. There are 6 streets.

Geography 
Nikolayevka is located 56 km southwest of Narimanov (the district's administrative centre) by road. Polynny and Razyezd-2 are the nearest rural localities.

References 

Rural localities in Narimanovsky District